Gymnobela muricata is a species of sea snail, a marine gastropod mollusk in the family Raphitomidae.

Description
The length of the shell attains 69.1 mm, its diameter 25.7 mm.

Distribution
This marine species occurs off the Tanimbar Islands, Indonesia and in the Arafura Sea, at depths between 836 m - 891 m.

References

External links
 MNHN, Pzris: holotype
 

muricata
Gastropods described in 1997